Tom Malone is a judge of the Kansas Court of Appeals.  He has judged on this court since 2003.

Biography
Judge Malone was born on December 29, 1953, in Wichita, Kansas.  He graduated from Kansas Newman College in 1976 and from Washburn Law School in 1979.  He is now married and has three children.

Legal career
Judge Malone practiced law with the firm Redmond & Nazar, L.L.P. for 12 years with a focus on business and commercial litigation.  He also taught business law at Kansas Newman College during this time.  In 1990, he was elected to the Sedgwick County District Court, where he judged for 12 years.

References

External links
 Kansas Court of Appeals website

Kansas Court of Appeals Judges
Living people
1953 births
People from Wichita, Kansas
Newman University, Wichita alumni
Washburn University alumni
20th-century American lawyers
21st-century American judges